Tirttanakiri Sivakozhundeesvarar Temple
(தீர்த்தனகிரி சிவக்கொழுந்தீசுவரர் கோயில்
)is a Hindu temple located at Theerthanagiri in Cuddalore district, Tamil Nadu, India. The presiding deity is Shiva. He is called as Shivakozhundhu Easwarar. His consort is known as Oppila Nayaki.

Significance 
It is one of the shrines of the 275 Paadal Petra Sthalams - Shiva Sthalams glorified in the early medieval Tevaram poems by Tamil Saivite Nayanars Sundarar.

References

External links

Shiva temples in Cuddalore district
Padal Petra Stalam